University Park Historic District may refer to:

University Park Historic District (Tempe, Arizona), listed on the National Register of Historic Places (NRHP) in Maricopa County, Arizona
North University Park Historic District, Los Angeles, California, NRHP-listed
University Park-Emory Highlands-Emory Estates Historic District, Decatur, Georgia, NRHP-listed
University Park (Indianapolis, Indiana), NRHP-listed
University Park Historic District (University Park, Maryland), NRHP-listed
University Park Historic District (Buffalo, New York), NRHP-listed

See also
University Neighborhood Historic District (disambiguation)